Maharajganj is a town and nagar panchayat in Rae Bareli district, Uttar Pradesh, India. It serves as the headquarters of a tehsil. As of 2011, its population is 6,673, in 1,037 households.

History
Maharajganj was originally called Drigbijaiganj, after a bazar founded by Raja Drigbijai Singh in the village of Atrehta And appointed Sheikh Shubhan, the Zamindar of Jihawa, as the Zilladar of Digvijay Ganj Bazar.Later, Sheikh Shubhan changed the name of the market to Maharajganj in honor of Raja Sahib.For years, the rule of Sheikh Shubhan and his descendants continued on the Maharajganj market.Shaykh Shubhan, whose ancestors were from the lineage of the first Caliph of Islam, Abu Bakr Siddiqui, came to India from Arabia via Iran in 11th century.In 1935, Sheikh Bashir Ahmed Siddiqui, the grandson of Sheikh Shubhan, got Maharajganj the status of town area from the then British government.. Drigjibai Singh was the Kanhpuria raja of Simrauta and the ancestors of the rajas of Chandapur.

Maharajganj was made the seat of a tehsil in 1869 when Raebareli district underwent a major administrative overhaul. The tehsil was made up of 6 parganas: Mohanganj, Simrauta, Inhauna, Kumhrawan, Bachhrawan, and Hardoi. Maharajganj itself was in Simrauta pargana.

At the turn of the 20th century, Maharajganj was administratively counted as part of the village of Atrehta. It had the tehsil headquarters, a police station, a dispensary, a post office, an inspection bungalow, a cattle pound, and a large middle school. The bazar then functioned as the main market in the northern part of Raebareli district.

Maharajganj was first upgraded from village to town status in 1935, at the same time as Bachhrawan, Dalmau, Jais, and Lalganj.

Maharajganj was declassified as a town during the 1961 census due to non-fulfilment of urban conditions. It was recorded as comprising 4 hamlets, with a total population of 2,619 people (1,363 male and 1,256 female), in 626 households and 612 physical houses. Its area was given as 169 acres. It was described as holding a market twice per week, on Mondays and Fridays; the market specialised in leather and utensils and had an average attendance of about 2,000. At that point, Maharajganj had a hospital and a post office, as well as the following small industrial establishments: 5 grain mills, 7 ,miscellaneous food processing facilities, 5 makers of clothing, 1 maker of products made from cork/bamboo/cane/leaves, 4 shoe manufacturers, 1 maker of brass and/or bell metal products, 7 bicycle repair shops, 15 makers of jewellery and/or precious metal items, and 1 manufacturer/repairer not assigned to any category.

Maharajganj was returned to town status at the 1981 census. At that time, its main imports were listed as brass sheets, cloth, and jaggery; the main items manufactured were brass utensils, leather, and pulses; and the main exports were leather, wheat, and pulses.

Demographics

According to the 2011 census, Maharajganj has a population of 6,673 people, in 1,037 households. The town's sex ratio is 915 females to every 1000 males;  3,485 of Maharajganj's residents are male (52.2%) and 3,188 are female (47.8%). The 0-6 age group makes up about 13.1% of the town's population; the sex ratio for this group is 923, which is above the district-wide urban ratio of 909 for this group. Members of Scheduled Castes make up 13.59% of the town's population, while no members of Scheduled Tribes were recorded. The town's literacy rate was 80.75% (counting only people age 7 and up); literacy was higher among men and boys (86.74%) than among women and girls (74.19%). The scheduled castes literacy rate is 69.89% (78.6% among men and boys, and 59.95% among women and girls).

In terms of employment, 20.11% of Maharajganj residents were classified as main workers (i.e. people employed for at least 6 months per year) in 2011. Marginal workers (i.e. people employed for less than 6 months per year) made up 11.45%, and the remaining 68.44% were non-workers. Employment status varied significantly according to gender, with 49.58% of men being either main or marginal workers, compared to 11.86% of women.

51.69% of Maharajganj residents live in slum conditions as of 2011. There are 5 slum areas in Maharajganj: Vaishya Nagar, Shanti Nagar, Rudra Nagar, Aryanagar, and Gandhi Nagar Ward No. 1. These range in size from about 95 to 135 households and have between 22 and 44 tap water access points. The number of flush toilets installed in people's homes ranges from 15 to 35. All 5 areas are serviced by a mix of open and closed sewers.

Villages
Maharajganj CD block has the following 75 villages:

References

Cities and towns in Raebareli district